The Bad Seed is a 1956 American psychological thriller film directed by Mervyn LeRoy and starring Nancy Kelly, Patty McCormack, Henry Jones and Eileen Heckart.

The film is based upon the 1954 play of the same name by Maxwell Anderson, which in turn is based upon William March's 1954 novel of the same name. The screenplay was written by John Lee Mahin.

Plot
Kenneth and Christine Penmark dote on their eight-year-old daughter Rhoda. Kenneth leaves on military duty. Monica, the Penmarks' neighbor and landlady, visits. Rhoda, pristine and proper in her pinafore dress and blonde pigtails, tells her about a penmanship competition that she lost to her schoolmate Claude Daigle. Rhoda then leaves for her school picnic at the lake.

Christine is having lunch with friends when they hear a radio report that Claude has drowned in the lake. Christine worries that her daughter might be traumatized, but Rhoda is unfazed by the incident and goes about her life. Rhoda's teacher Miss Fern visits Christine, revealing that Rhoda was the last person to have seen Claude alive and that she was seen grabbing at Claude's medal. She hints that Rhoda might have some connection to Claude's death and adds that Rhoda will not be welcome at the school after the current term ends. Claude's parents barge in, and Mrs. Daigle is distraught and drunk, accusing Miss Fern of withholding information. When Christine finds the medal in Rhoda's room, she demands an explanation. Rhoda tells Christine that Claude gave it to her.

Christine's father Richard visits. Haunted by confusing memories about her own childhood, Christine confronts him and he reveals that she was adopted. Christine is horrified to learn that she is actually the daughter of a notorious serial killer. She worries that her origin is the cause of Rhoda's sociopathy and that her behavior is genetic. Richard tries to convince her that it is nurture, not nature, that primarily influences such behavior.

Christine catches Rhoda trying to dispose of her tap shoes in the household incinerator and realizes that Rhoda must have hit Claude with the shoes, which had left odd crescent-shaped marks on his face that could not be identified. Alternately feigning tears and angrily blaming Claude, Rhoda admits that she killed the boy for his medal and confirms Christine's suspicion that, to acquire a keepsake, she had previously murdered an elderly neighbor when they had lived in Wichita, Kansas. Christine orders Rhoda to burn the shoes in the incinerator.

The next day, the caretaker Leroy teasingly tells Rhoda that he believes that she killed Claude. After Rhoda angrily tells him that she burned her shoes, Leroy opens the incinerator and finds the remains. A drunk Mrs. Daigle returns and tells Christine that she believes that Rhoda knows what happened to her son.

Realizing that Leroy knows the truth, Rhoda sets his excelsior bedding ablaze. After some men break open the basement hatch, Leroy runs into the yard aflame, ultimately burning to death. From the window, Christine and Monica see him die, which makes Christine hysterical. That night, a strangely calm Christine tells Rhoda that she dropped the medal into the lake, then gives her daughter a lethal dose of sleeping pills. Christine attempts to kill herself with a gunshot to the head. However, the gunshot alerts the neighbors and Rhoda and Christine are taken to the hospital. They both survive, although Christine is in a coma. Kenneth arrives and takes Rhoda home.

At bedtime, Rhoda excitedly tells Kenneth that she will inherit Monica's pet lovebird. She also mentions that she and Monica plan to sunbathe on the roof soon. Christine regains consciousness and is expected to make a full recovery. She calls Kenneth and tells him that she must pay for her "dreadful sin" but Kenneth assures her that they will work on their problems together.

At night, Rhoda sneaks away during a rainstorm and attempts to retrieve the medal from the bay with a net on a metal pole. A sudden bolt of lightning strikes her, presumably causing her death.

Cast
 Nancy Kelly as Christine Penmark
 Patty McCormack as Rhoda Penmark
 Henry Jones as Leroy Jessup
 Eileen Heckart as Hortense Daigle
 Evelyn Varden as Monica Breedlove
 William Hopper as Col. Kenneth Penmark
 Paul Fix as Richard Bravo
 Jesse White as Emory Wages
 Gage Clarke as Reginald 'Reggie' Tasker
 Joan Croydon as Claudia Fern (as Joan Croyden)
 Frank Cady as Henry Daigle
 Don C. Harvey as Guard in Hospital Corridor (uncredited)

Production
After the success of the book, Geoffrey Shurlock of the Production Code Administration (PCA) sent a letter to Jack Warner stating that “the property violated the spirit and letter of the Code.” Shurlock’s office wrote to Paramount Pictures, Columbia Pictures and Universal Pictures to caution them against the property. Although the studios had not yet formally inquired about it, Buddy Adler, Frank McCarthy and Dore Schary were interested in producing the film. After a bidding war, Warner purchased the film rights for $300,000 (equivalent to $ in 2021). United States Pictures stated that it would only produce the film for Warner Brothers Pictures upon approval by the PCA. Adler contacted Shurlock demanding to know why approval had been given. Shurlock responded that director Mervyn LeRoy had devised a treatment "that seemed to do what the office thought was impossible."

Although the novel and play conclude with Christine dying and Rhoda surviving, the Motion Picture Production Code did not permit perpetrators of crime to remain unpunished. The film's ending thus reverses the deaths of the mother and daughter, with Christine's life saved and Rhoda killed by a bolt of lightning. In another move to appease the censors, Warner Bros. added an "adults only" warning to the film's advertising. The film softens the shocking ending with a segment in which an announcer introduces the members of the cast. It concludes with Kelly lightheartedly spanking McCormack for her character's misdeeds.

Reception
The Bad Seed was one of the larger hits of 1956 for Warner Bros., earning the company $4.1 million in theatrical rentals in the U.S. against a $1 million budget. The film finished among the year's top 20 at the box office in the United States and among the ten most popular box-office draws in Britain in 1956.

Awards and nominations

Other honors
The film is recognized by American Film Institute in these lists:
 2001: AFI's 100 Years...100 Thrills – Nominated

Influence and legacy
McCormack starred in the 1995 low-budget film Mommy as a psychopathic mother and in House of Deadly Secrets in 2018. Some consider both films as unofficial sequels to The Bad Seed.

The first act of the 1992 off-Broadway musical Ruthless! is inspired by the film.

The 1993 film The Good Son is partly inspired by The Bad Seed.

Remakes
The Bad Seed was remade for television in 1985, adapted by George Eckstein, directed by Paul Wendkos and starring Carrie Welles, Blair Brown, Lynn Redgrave, David Carradine, Richard Kiley and Chad Allen. The remake employs the original ending of the March novel and its stage production but was panned by critics and poorly received by its television audience.

In June 2015, it was announced that Lifetime would remake The Bad Seed. In December 2017, Deadline.com reported that Rob Lowe was to direct and star in the remake with Mckenna Grace, Sarah Dugdale, Marci T. House, Lorne Cardinal, Chris Shields, Cara Buono and a special appearance by McCormack as Dr. March. The film aired in September 2018.

See also
List of American films of 1956

References

External links
 

 
 

1956 films
1950s psychological thriller films
American black-and-white films
American films based on plays
American horror thriller films
American psychological thriller films
Film noir
Films about juvenile delinquency
Films about children
Films about child death
Films based on adaptations
Films based on American novels
Films based on thriller novels
Films directed by Mervyn LeRoy
Films featuring a Best Supporting Actress Golden Globe-winning performance
Films scored by Alex North
Warner Bros. films
The Bad Seed
1956 horror films
American serial killer films
1950s English-language films
1950s American films